The Aspen Times is an 11,500-circulation, 7-day-a-week newspaper in the ski resort town of Aspen, Colorado, United States, with a history dating back to 1881.

History
The Aspen Weekly Times' first issue was published April 23, 1881 when Aspen was a silver mining town, and the purpose of the newspaper was to bring news about the outside world to miners. The original owner was D.H. Waite & Co under the leadership of Davis Hanson Waite who sold the paper to B. Clark Wheeler in 1885 and later became Governor of Colorado. Within months, Wheeler converted the paper into a daily. Wheeler was a promoter and had various business interests. In 1880, Wheeler changed the name of the city from Ute City to Aspen. In the 1890s, the paper returned to a weekly publication schedule as the population of Aspen dropped due to the bust in silver prices.

In 1956, Bil Dunaway, a U.S. Army 10th Mountain Division veteran, bought The Aspen Times, and over the next 35 years would amass a local media empire. At one time, he owned KSNO-AM 1260, Aspen's cable TV company and its only newspaper. Downvalley, he also owned Glenwood Springs, Colorado radio station KMTS-FM 99.1, the Valley Journal in Carbondale, Colorado, The Rifle Telegram and Climbing magazine.  Dunaway was a crusading newspaper editor as well as a world-class ski racer and a prolific mountaineer.

A daily again
In 1988, Dunaway hired Dave Price to create a daily edition of the Aspen Times. Price had previously been a reporter at the Aspen Daily News and news director at KSNO and KTYE radio stations. After months of planning, the "'Aspen Times Daily'" was launched on November 9, 1988 with Price as its first editor. The first issue came out the morning after a major local election, and the headline on the inaugural issue was "Dems sweep county." 

In 1990, Price covered the arrest of gonzo journalist Hunter S. Thompson on sex assault charges. The charges were dropped after Price reported that the alleged victim was an undercover agent who fabricated the assault claim in order to give the district attorney a pretext for searching Thompson's Woody Creek ranch for drugs. Thompson reprinted some of Price's stories in his 1990 book "Gonzo Papers, Vol. 3: Songs of the Doomed: More Notes on the Death of the American Dream."

In 1992, Dunaway sold the Times to a group led by Loren Jenkins, a Pulitzer Prize-winning reporter for the Washington Post. Jenkins improved the newspaper by redesigning it and bringing in national and international news and cultural reporting and reviews from the services of the New York Times and the Washington Post. He also gave the newspaper an editorial edge that sought to slow down rampant development and preserve the local values and nature that had always made the Roaring Fork valley special. Jenkins left town in 1996, taking the post of foreign desk editor at National Public Radio.

In 1995, the ownership of the paper changed again, and this time the group included as many as nine investors by some reports. Among them were local businessmen George Stranahan, Michael McVoy and longtime Times writer and novelist Andy Stone.

Swift Communications
On December 1, 1999, the Aspen Times was purchased by Swift Communications of Carson City, Nevada in a regional newspaper buy up. Swift moved all printing operations to Gypsum, Colorado. Swift Communications owns at least ten other Colorado resort town newspapers. All of their online newspapers share the same content management system and as of May, 2011 the ability for readers to leave comments about articles was indefinitely removed, due to issues of incivility.

In Fall of 2011, the Aspen Times re-enabled anonymous commenting for users with an active Facebook account.

The Aspen Times printed both weekly and daily editions until 2004, when the weekly was converted into a Sunday edition. At that point, the Times Daily went from Monday-Friday to seven days a week. The word "Daily" was dropped from the title of the daily paper in the 1990s.

On April 13, 2022 Vladislav Doronin, an international real estate developer and art collector, who was involved in a real estate development at the entrance to the Aspen Mountain ski area, sued Swift Communications for defamation with respect to the newspaper's coverage and characterization of Doronin. The legal action was settled by confidential agreement and dismissed May 27, 2022. During the pendency of the suit, coverage of Doronin was suspended by the publisher. Tension over the matter resulted in firing of the editor, Andrew Travers.

References

External links
 Aspen Times official web site

Aspen, Colorado
Companies based in Pitkin County, Colorado
Free daily newspapers
Newspapers published in Colorado
Publications established in 1881
1881 establishments in Colorado